Adrianus Lambertus Joseph "Bob" Maas (18 October 1907, Batavia, Dutch East Indies – 17 December 1996. Hilversum) was a sailor from the Netherlands, who represented his native country at the 1932 Summer Olympics in Los Angeles and took the Silver medal. In that same Olympics, Maas and his brother Jan Maas, competed in the Dutch Star Holland. In this series Maas took the 6th place. The Maas brothers took part at their own cost.

In 1936, with Willem de Vries Lentsch as crew, Maas took part in the Dutch Star BEM II and took the Bronze. During the 1948 Summer Olympics Bob Maas also took a Bronze medal in the Star. This time with Eddy Stutterheim as crew. His last Olympic appearance was in 1952 again with Eddy Stutterheim as crew. This time they finished 8th.

Bob Maas is the older brother of Jan Maas.

Sources
 
 
 
 
 
 
 
 
 
 
 
 
 
 

1907 births
1996 deaths
Dutch male sailors (sport)
Olympic sailors of the Netherlands
Sailors at the 1932 Summer Olympics – Snowbird
Sailors at the 1932 Summer Olympics – Star
Sailors at the 1936 Summer Olympics – Star
Sailors at the 1948 Summer Olympics – Star
Sailors at the 1952 Summer Olympics – Star
Medalists at the 1932 Summer Olympics
Medalists at the 1936 Summer Olympics
Medalists at the 1948 Summer Olympics
Olympic medalists in sailing
Olympic silver medalists for the Netherlands
Olympic bronze medalists for the Netherlands
People from Batavia, Dutch East Indies